Euhadra quaesita, common name, the sought-after false hadra, is a species of air-breathing land snail, a terrestrial pulmonate gastropod mollusc in the family Bradybaenidae. This species is found in Japan.

This species is unusual in that its shell is sinistral.

This species of snail makes and uses love darts as part of its courtship behavior.

References

quaesita
Gastropods described in 1850